was an officer and ace fighter pilot in the Imperial Japanese Navy (IJN) during the Second Sino-Japanese War.  In action in the war, Nangō was officially credited with destroying eight enemy aircraft.

Nangō graduated from the Naval Academy Etajima in 1927 and completed flight training in November 1932.  After a tour of duty with the aircraft carrier Akagi's fighter group, he spent two years in London as the assistant naval attache in the Japanese embassy.

After returning to Japan, Nangō was posted to the 13th Air Group in October 1937 soon after the outbreak of renewed hostilities with China.  In a single engagement over Nanking on 2 December 1937, he was credited with destroying two Chinese aircraft.  Later that month, Nangō was assigned as a division commander in the carrier Sōryū's fighter group.

In July 1938, Nangō assumed command of the 15th Air Group, based in Anqing.  He led his fighter group in air operations supporting ground forces around Hankow and protecting shipping in the Yangtze River.  Unsanitary conditions at Anqing contributed to ill health in many of the 15th's pilots, including Nangō, but he refused to be taken off flying duty.  On 18 July 1938, he was killed during an aerial battle when his aircraft collided with a Chinese Polikarpov I-15 fighter flown by Soviet volunteer Valentin Dudonov.  Nangō's death in battle was widely publicized in Japan and his funeral was attended by the vice minister of the navy, Isoroku Yamamoto.

References

1906 births
1938 deaths
Japanese naval aviators
Military personnel from Hiroshima Prefecture
Japanese flying aces
Imperial Japanese Navy officers
Japanese military personnel killed in action
Military personnel killed in the Second Sino-Japanese War